Mishnaic Hebrew is the Hebrew of Talmudic texts. Mishnaic Hebrew can be sub-divided into Mishnaic Hebrew proper (also called Tannaitic Hebrew, Early Rabbinic Hebrew, or Mishnaic Hebrew I), which was a spoken language, and Amoraic Hebrew (also called Late Rabbinic Hebrew or Mishnaic Hebrew II), which was a literary language only.

The Mishnaic Hebrew language, or Early Rabbinic Hebrew language, is one of the direct ancient descendants of Biblical Hebrew as preserved after the Babylonian captivity, and definitively recorded by Jewish sages in writing the Mishnah and other contemporary documents. 

A transitional form of the language occurs in the other works of Tannaitic literature dating from the century beginning with the completion of the Mishnah. These include the halachic Midrashim (Sifra, Sifre, Mechilta etc.) and the expanded collection of Mishnah-related material known as the Tosefta. The Talmud contains excerpts from these works, as well as further Tannaitic material not attested elsewhere; the generic term for these passages is Baraitot. The language of all these works is very similar to Mishnaic Hebrew.

Historical occurrence
Mishnaic Hebrew is found primarily from the 1st to the 4th centuries, corresponding to the Roman period after the destruction of the Temple in Jerusalem. It developed under the profound influence of spoken Aramaic. Also called Tannaitic Hebrew or Early Rabbinic Hebrew, it is represented by the bulk of the Mishnah (published around 200) and the Tosefta within the Talmud, and by some of the Dead Sea Scrolls, notably the Copper Scroll and the Bar Kokhba Letters.

Dead Sea Scrolls archaeologist Yigael Yadin mentions that three Bar Kokhba documents he and his team found at Nahal Hever are written in Mishnaic Hebrew, and that it was Bar Kokhba who revived the Hebrew language and made Hebrew the official language of the state during the Bar Kokhba revolt (AD 132–135). Yadin also notes the shift from Aramaic to Hebrew during the time of the Bar Kokhba revolt in his book Bar Kokhba: The Rediscovery of the Legendary Hero of the Last Jewish Revolt Against Imperial Rome; he says, "It is interesting that the earlier documents are written in Aramaic while the later ones are in Hebrew. Possibly the change was made by a special decree of Bar-Kokhba who wanted to restore Hebrew as the official language of the state" (p. 181). In the book A Roadmap to the Heavens: An Anthropological Study of Hegemony among Priests, Sages, and Laymen (Judaism and Jewish Life) by Sigalit Ben-Zion (p. 155), Yadin remarks: "it seems that this change came as a result of the order that was given by Bar Kokhba, who wanted to revive the Hebrew language and make it the official language of the state."

However, less than a century after the publication of the Mishnah, Mishnaic Hebrew began to fall into disuse as a spoken language. The Babylonian Gemara (circa 500), as well as the earlier Jerusalem Talmud published between 350 and 400, generally comment on the Mishnah and Baraitot in Aramaic. Nevertheless, Hebrew survived as a liturgical and literary language in the form of later Amoraic Hebrew, which sometimes occurs in the Gemara text.

Phonology
Many of the characteristic features of Mishnaic Hebrew pronunciation may well have been found already in the period of Late Biblical Hebrew. A notable characteristic distinguishing it from Biblical Hebrew of the classical period is the spirantization of post-vocalic stops (b, g, d, p, t, k), which it has in common with Aramaic.

A new characteristic is that final /m/ is often replaced with final /n/ in the Mishna (see Bava Kama 1:4, ""), but only in agreement morphemes. Perhaps the final nasal consonant in the morphemes was not pronounced, and the vowel previous to it was nasalized. Alternatively, the agreement morphemes may have changed under the influence of Aramaic.

Also, some surviving manuscripts of the Mishna confuse guttural consonants, especially ʾaleph (a glottal stop) and ʿayin (a voiced pharyngeal fricative). That could be a sign that they were pronounced the same way in Mishnaic Hebrew.

Reconstructed Mishnaic Hebrew pronunciation
Consonants

Vowels

Morphology
Mishnaic Hebrew displays various changes from Biblical Hebrew, some appearing already in the Hebrew of the Dead Sea Scrolls. Some, but not all, are retained in Modern Hebrew.

For the expression of possession, Mishnaic Hebrew mostly replaces the Biblical Hebrew status constructus with analytic constructions involving  'of'.

Mishnaic Hebrew lacks the waw-consecutive.

The past is expressed by using the same form as in Modern Hebrew. For example, (Pirkei Avoth 1:1): "". ("Moses received the Torah from Sinai".)

Continuous past is expressed using the present tense of to be unlike Biblical but like Modern Hebrew. For example, (Pirke Avoth 1:2): "" ("He often said".)

Present is expressed using the same form as in Modern Hebrew, by using the participle. For example, (Pirke Avoth 1:2): "". ("The world is sustained by three things", lit. "On three things the world stands")

Future can be expressed using  + infinitive. For example, (Pirke Avoth 3:1): "". However, unlike Modern Hebrew but like contemporary Aramaic, the present active participle can also express the future. It mostly replaces the imperfect (prefixed) form in that function.

The imperfect (prefixed) form, which is used for the future in modern Hebrew, expresses an imperative (order), volition or similar meanings in Mishnaic Hebrew. For example, (Pirke Avoth 1:3): "" ("He would say, don't be like slaves serving the master...", lit. "...you will not be..."). In a sense, one could say that the form pertains to the future in Mishnaic Hebrew as well, but it invariably has a modal (imperative, volitional, etc.) aspect in the main clause.

See also
Tiberian Hebrew (liturgical)
Yemenite Hebrew (liturgical)
Sanaani Hebrew (liturgical)
Sephardi Hebrew (liturgical)
Ashkenazi Hebrew (liturgical)
Mizrahi Hebrew (liturgical)
Modern Hebrew (State of Israel)

References

Further reading
 Bar-Asher, Moshe, Mishnaic Hebrew: An Introductory Survey, Hebrew Studies 40 (1999) 115-151.
 Kutscher, E.Y. A Short History of the Hebrew Language, Jerusalem: Magnes Press, Leiden: E.J.Brill, 1982 pp. 115–146.
 Pérez Fernández, Miguel, An Introductory Grammar of Rabbinic Hebrew (trans. John Elwolde), Leiden: E.J. Brill 1997.
 Sáenz-Badillos, Angel,  A History of the Hebrew Language  (trans. John Elwolde),  Cambridge, England:  Cambridge University Press, 1993.
 M. H. Segal, Mishnaic Hebrew and its Relation to Biblical Hebrew and to Aramaic, JQR 20 (1908): 647–73

External links
History of the Ancient and Modern Hebrew Language, David Steinberg
Short History of the Hebrew Language, Chaim Rabin

Hebrew
Mishnah
Chazal
Languages attested from the 1st century
Languages extinct in the 4th century